Suwallia is a genus of green stoneflies in the family Chloroperlidae. There are more than 20 described species in Suwallia.

Species
These 25 species belong to the genus Suwallia:

 Suwallia amoenacolens Alexander & Stewart, 1999
 Suwallia asiatica Zhiltzova & Levanidova, 1978
 Suwallia autumna (Hoppe, 1938)
 Suwallia bimaculata (Okamoto, 1912)
 Suwallia decolorata Zhiltzova & Levanidova, 1978
 Suwallia dubia (Frison, 1935)
 Suwallia jezoensis (Kohno, 1953)
 Suwallia kerzhneri Zhiltzova & Zwick, 1971
 Suwallia lineosa (Banks, 1918)
 Suwallia marginata (Banks, 1897) (York sallfly)
 Suwallia nipponica (Okamoto, 1912)
 Suwallia pallidula (Banks, 1904)
 Suwallia sachalina Zhiltzova, 1978
 Suwallia salish Alexander & Stewart, 1999
 Suwallia shepardi Alexander & Stewart, 1999
 Suwallia shimizui Alexander & Stewart, 1999
 Suwallia sierra Baumann & Bottorff, 1997
 Suwallia starki Alexander & Stewart, 1999
 Suwallia sublimis Alexander & Stewart, 1999
 Suwallia talalajensis Zhiltzova, 1976
 Suwallia teleckojensis (Šámal, 1939)
 Suwallia thoracica (Okamoto, 1912)
 Suwallia tsudai (Kawai, 1967)
 Suwallia wardi Kondratieff & Kirchner, 1991
 Suwallia wolongshana Du & Chen, 2015

References

Further reading

 
 

Chloroperlidae
Articles created by Qbugbot